Jason Camm is a Canadian curler from Rockland, Ontario. He currently skips his own team out of Navan, Ontario.

Career

Juniors
In 2011, Camm won both the Ontario Bantam Boys Championship and the Ontario Bantam Mixed Championship, both as a skip.

After Bantams, Camm formed a junior team with Aaron Squires as skip, and Camm throwing last rocks. The team won the 2013 Ontario Junior Championships and earned the right to represent the province at the 2013 Canadian Junior Curling Championships. The team finished the event with a 7-3 record, tied with Manitoba's Matt Dunstone in third place. The two teams played in each other in a tiebreaker for a playoff spot, with Camm and Team Ontario losing 11-8.

In the middle of his junior career, Camm joined the Bryan Cochrane rink playing third, and played in his first provincial championships, the 2014 Travelers Tankard. After the team posted a 6-4 round robin record, they beat Jake Walker in the 3 vs. 4 game, before losing in the semifinal to Mark Bice.

In 2015, Camm joined the Doug Kee junior rink at third and won another Ontario Junior Championship in 2016. Representing Ontario at the 2016 Canadian Junior Curling Championships, the team finished with a 5-5 record, missing the playoffs.

Men's
After juniors, Camm began playing on the World Curling Tour. He played second for Pat Ferris for the 2016-17 season, third for Mike McLean in the 2017-18 season and second Martin Ferland in 2018-19, before skipping his own team in 2019.

The McLean rink qualified for the 2018 Ontario Tankard. The team lost all three games in the triple knockout event.

While with Ferland, Camm curled out of Quebec and played in the 2019 WFG Tankard, the Quebec men's provincial championship. There, the team finished with a 4-5 record, missing the playoffs.

Skipping his own rink of Jordie Lyon-Hather, Kurt Armstron and Brett Lyon-Hatcher, Camm won the Mooshead Classic Open event. His team also qualified for the 2020 Ontario Tankard, where they finished with a 2–6 record.

For the 2021–22 curling season, Camm teamed up with Matthew Hall, Cameron Goodkey and Jordie Lyon-Hather. Following the cancellation of the open qualifier for the 2022 Ontario Tankard due to the COVID-19 pandemic in Ontario, the team was invited to play in the event. There, the team made it through the qualifying round with a 5–2 record, making it to the playoffs. In the playoffs, the team beat Sam Mooibroek before losing in the semifinal to John Epping. 

The next season, Camm for a new team with Ian Dickie, Zack Shurtleff and Punit Sthankiya. The team won two tour events, the Capital Curling Fall Open and the Capital Curling Classic. Their success on the tour qualified them for the 2023 Ontario Tankard.

Personal life
Camm's brother Mat is also a curler.

References

External links

Living people
Canadian male curlers
Curlers from Ontario
People from Clarence-Rockland
Year of birth missing (living people)
21st-century Canadian people